The Clearwater River is in the northwestern United States, in north central Idaho.

By average discharge, the Clearwater River is the largest tributary of the Snake River. The River got its name for the Niimiipuutímt naming as Koos-Koos-Kia - "clear water".

Its mean annual discharge is

Course
In the small town of Kooskia, the Middle Fork and South Fork of the Clearwater River join their waters to form the main stem of the Clearwater. The larger Middle Fork is made up of the combined flows of the Lochsa and Selway rivers which flow from the Bitterroot Mountains located to the east, while the much smaller South Fork originates in the Selway-Bitterroot Wilderness to the south. From the confluence, the Clearwater flows northwest, passing the Heart of the Monster site of the Nez Perce National Historical Park. U.S. Route 12 follows the river to Kamiah, where Lawyer Creek from the southwest joins it.

The river continues northwest through a canyon to the confluence with Lolo Creek from the east. It soon passes the town of Greer and receives Jim Ford Creek from the east. After the North Fork contributes its flow, the Clearwater continues west and receives Big Canyon Creek from the south and Bedrock Creek from the north.

As the river canyon cuts deeper into the Columbia Plateau, the Clearwater passes the unincorporated communities of Lenore and Myrtle, where it receives Cottonwood Creek from the southeast, and Arrow, where it receives the Potlatch River from the north. Lapwai Creek joins from the south, where the river passes close to Spalding. Here, U.S. Route 95 crosses the Clearwater and is co-signed with U.S. Route 12 along the river's north bank for several miles. The river soon widens and slows into the slack water of Lower Granite Lake as it approaches Lewiston. Just as it crosses the Idaho-Washington state line, it joins its waters with the Snake River.

Tributaries
The Clearwater breaks into several separate forks:

 Clearwater River (west of Orofino to Lewiston-Snake River)
 Potlatch River (Latah, Clearwater and Nez Perce Counties)
 North Fork Clearwater River (stream, Clearwater County - ; headwaters near Illinois Peak to just west of Orofino)
 Little North Fork Clearwater River (stream, Shoshone & Clearwater Counties; headwaters in south-central Shoshone County, joins the North Fork in the Dworshak Reservoir)
 Middle Fork Clearwater River (stream, Idaho County - ; formed by the confluence of the Selway and Lochsa at Lowell)
 South Fork Clearwater River (stream, Idaho County - ; headwaters near Red River Hot Springs to Kooskia, confluence with the Middle Fork)
 Little Clearwater River (stream, Idaho County - ; near Three Prong Mountain to near Spot Mountain)

River modifications
The Dworshak Reservoir is the only major lake on the Clearwater system, created from the Dworshak Dam, completed in the early 1970s.  Dworshak Dam is on the North Fork of the Clearwater River and is just northwest of Orofino. There is no fish ladder; the dam blocks salmon and steelhead passage.

History
The border between Washington and Idaho was defined as the meridian running north from the confluence of the Clearwater River and the Snake River.  Although this border is often referred to as the 117th meridian west longitude, the actual border line is slightly west (less than 2 miles) of the 117th meridian.

See also

List of rivers of Idaho
List of longest streams of Idaho

References

External links

 , USGS GNIS

Rivers of Idaho
Tributaries of the Snake River
Rivers of Clearwater County, Idaho
Rivers of Idaho County, Idaho
Rivers of Shoshone County, Idaho
Rivers of Nez Perce County, Idaho
Clearwater National Forest